Purse Strings is a 1933 British drama film directed by Henry Edwards and starring Chili Bouchier, Gyles Isham and Allan Jeayes. It was made as a quota quickie at British and Dominion's Elstree Studios.

Cast
 Chili Bouchier as Mary Willmore  
 Gyles Isham as James Willmore  
 G. H. Mulcaster as Edward Ashby  
 Allan Jeayes as Walford  
 Joan Henley as Ida Bentley  
 Evelyn Roberts as Beauchamp

References

Bibliography
 Low, Rachael. Filmmaking in 1930s Britain. George Allen & Unwin, 1985.
 Wood, Linda. British Films, 1927-1939. British Film Institute, 1986.

External links

1933 films
British drama films
1933 drama films
Films directed by Henry Edwards
Films set in England
Quota quickies
British and Dominions Studios films
Films shot at Imperial Studios, Elstree
British black-and-white films
1930s English-language films
1930s British films